Aleisanthia is a genus of flowering plants in the family Rubiaceae. It holds only two species, both of which are endemic to Peninsular Malaysia.

Species 
 Aleisanthia rupestris (Ridl.) Ridl. - Selangor
 Aleisanthia sylvatica Ridl. - Kelantan

References

External links 
 Aleisanthia in the World Checklist of Rubiaceae

Rubiaceae genera
Aleisanthieae